The Diario de Centro América is the newspaper of public record in Guatemala. Founded in 1880, it is the official newspaper of the country's government.

References

External links
  Diario de Centro América

Newspapers published in Guatemala